The 2015 Nielsen Pro Tennis Championship was a professional tennis tournament played on hard courts. It was the 24th edition of the tournament which was part of the 2015 ATP Challenger Tour. It took place in Winnetka, Illinois, between 6 and 12 July, 2015.

Singles main-draw entrants

Seeds

 1 Rankings are as of June 23, 2015.

Other entrants
The following players received wildcards into the singles main draw:
  Tom Fawcett
  Jared Hiltzik
  Stefan Kozlov
  Mackenzie McDonald

The following player received entry as an alternate into the singles main draw:
  Frank Dancevic
  Tennys Sandgren

The following players received entry from the qualifying draw:
  Marcos Giron
  Nicolas Meister
  Dennis Nevolo
  Andrew Whittington

The following player received entry as a lucky loser:
  Ernesto Escobedo

Champions

Singles

 Somdev Devvarman  def.  Daniel Nguyen, 7–5, 4–6, 7–6(7–5)

Doubles

 Johan Brunström /  Nicholas Monroe def.  Sekou Bangoura /  Frank Dancevic, 4–6, 6–3, [10–8]

External links
Official website (archived from http://nielsenprotennis.com/)

Nielsen Pro Tennis Championship
Nielsen Pro Tennis Championship
Nielsen
Nielsen Pro Tennis Championship
Nielsen Pro Tennis Championship